Francoise Adrianus Rodgers (born 10 September 1961), known as Francois Rodgers, is a South African politician from KwaZulu-Natal who has been the provincial leader of Democratic Alliance (DA) since 2021.

He is a Member of the KwaZulu-Natal Legislature and the leader of the DA's caucus. He was previously the party's caucus chief whip. From 2013 to 2014, Rodgers was a Member of Parliament (MP) in the National Assembly.

Rodgers started his political career as a DA councillor in Kokstad. He had served as the Deputy Provincial Leader of the DA from 2012 to 2015, before becoming the party's Provincial Chairperson in 2018. In 2021, he announced that he would be running to replace Zwakele Mncwango, who had announced intention to retire, as the Provincial Leader of the party. He was endorsed by Mncwango and seen as the front-runner. He was elected provincial leader on 27 March 2021, defeating the DA's caucus leader in eThekwini, Nicole Graham, and her deputy, Emmanuel Mhlongo.

References

External links
 Mr Francoise Adrianus Rodgers – People's Assembly

Members of the KwaZulu-Natal Legislature
Living people
Democratic Alliance (South Africa) politicians
White South African people
Members of the National Assembly of South Africa
1961 births